"Trouble" is a song by American singer-songwriter and record producer Bei Maejor. The song, released on August 12, 2011, as a digital download, serves as his debut single and the lead single from his upcoming debut studio album. The song features American rapper J. Cole and was produced by Maejor himself.

Remix
The official remix was released on December 25, 2011, featuring American R&B singers T-Pain and Trey Songz along with rappers Wale and J. Cole. The remix was released on January 4, 2012 as a digital download single on iTunes and Amazon.

There is an additional version of the remix that replaces J. Cole's verse with a verse by rapper Nelly. That version was released on January 7, 2012.

Music video 
On August 28, 2011, behind-the-scenes pictures of the music video were released. This was the first video Maejor did for his label Jive Records. The video was directed by Declan Whitebloom and features Maejor being tested by temptation. The Detroit R&B recording artist tries to resist all the ladies, performing in a bedroom while girls crawl around the house, the pool, and even in his ride. The video was released September 19, 2011.

Chart performance
The song first charted on the week of August 2, 2011, on the Hot R&B/Hip-Hop Songs at number ninety-seven. It has since peaked at number thirty-four.

Charts

Release history

References

2011 songs
2011 singles
Maejor songs
Songs written by Maejor
Song recordings produced by Maejor
J. Cole songs
Songs written by J. Cole